Polytechnic University of the Philippines Pulilan Campus or PUP Pulilan is PUP campus located in the municipality of Pulilan, Bulacan, Philippines

The campus was created through a Memorandum of Agreement (MOA) between the University and the Municipal Government of Pulilan.

Academics
College of Business
 Bachelor of Science in Entrepreneurship
 Bachelor of Public Administration Major in Public Financial Management

References

External links
 Polytechnic University of the Philippines Official Website

Universities and colleges in Bulacan
Polytechnic University of the Philippines